See It Now is an American newsmagazine and documentary series broadcast by CBS from 1951 to 1958.  It was created by Edward R. Murrow and Fred W. Friendly, with Murrow as the host of the show. From 1952 to 1957, See It Now won four Emmy Awards, and was nominated three other times. It also won a 1952 Peabody Award.

Second Red Scare
Murrow produced a number of episodes of the show that dealt with the Second Red Scare (1947-1957) (one of the more notable episodes resulted in a U.S. military officer, Milo Radulovich, being acquitted, after being charged with supporting Communism), before embarking on a broadcast on March 9, 1954

Production
Don Hewitt was the director. Aluminum Company of America sponsored the program.

2000s
In September 2006, "See It Now" became the slogan for a relaunched CBS Evening News with new anchor Katie Couric.

See also
 Good Night, and Good Luck
 Murrow
 Person to Person, Murrow's companion, "lite fare" program
 Satchmo the Great

References

External links

 
 See It Now from the Museum of Broadcast Communications
 See it Now, March 9, 1954 and Senator McCarthy's response on April 6, hosted by the University of Maryland, College Park

1951 American television series debuts
1958 American television series endings
1950s American television news shows
1950s American documentary television series
Black-and-white American television shows
CBS original programming
English-language television shows
Peabody Award-winning television programs
Cultural depictions of Josip Broz Tito
Cultural depictions of Jawaharlal Nehru
Red Scare